Bianca Webb (born 14 September 2001) is an Australian rules footballer who played for the Fremantle Football Club in the AFL Women's (AFLW). Webb was drafted by Fremantle with their final selection, 85th overall, in the 2019 AFL Women's draft after playing for Swan Districts in the West Australian Women's Football League (WAWFL). It was announced she re-signed with the Dockers on 5 June 2021. In March 2023, Webb was delisted by Fremantle.

Statistics
Statistics are correct to the end of the 2021 season.

|- 
| scope="row" text-align:center | 2020
| 
| 26 || 5 || 0 || 0 || 18 || 9 || 27 || 4 || 11 || 0.0 || 0.0 || 3.6 || 1.8 || 5.4 || 1.2 || 2.2 || 0
|- style="background:#EAEAEA"
| scope="row" text-align:center | 2021
| 
| 26 || 7 || 1 || 1 || 32 || 11 || 43 || 8 || 20 || 0.1 || 0.1 || 4.6 || 1.6 || 6.1 || 1.1 || 2.9 || 0
|- class="sortbottom"
! colspan=3 | Career
! 12
! 1
! 1
! 50
! 20
! 70
! 12
! 31
! 0.1
! 0.1
! 4.2
! 1.7
! 5.8
! 1.0
! 2.6
! 0
|}

References

External links 

Living people
2001 births
Fremantle Football Club (AFLW) players
Australian rules footballers from Western Australia